Tachikawa is a city located in Tokyo, Japan.

Tachikawa may also refer to:

 Tachikawa (surname), a Japanese surname
 Tachikawa, Yamagata
 Tachikawa-ryu
 Tachikawa Airfield
 Tachikawa Aircraft Company